FC Ulytau (Ulytaý Fýtbol Klýby)  are a defunct Kazakhstani football based in Zhezkazgan, Kazakhstan. They were members of the Kazakhstan First Division.

Name History
1967 : Founded as Yenbek
1975 : The club is renamed Gornyak
1980 : The club is renamed Dzhezkazganets
1991 : The club is renamed Metallurg
1992 : The club is renamed Metallist
1997 : The club is renamed Ulytau

Ulytau, FC
1967 establishments in the Kazakh Soviet Socialist Republic